Disintegrin and metalloproteinase domain-containing protein 15 is an enzyme that in humans is encoded by the ADAM15 gene.

Function 

The protein encoded by this gene is a member of the ADAM (a disintegrin and metalloproteinase) protein family. ADAM family members are type I transmembrane glycoproteins known to be involved in cell adhesion and proteolytic ectodomain processing of cytokines and adhesion molecules. This protein contains multiple functional domains including a zinc-binding metalloprotease domain, a disintegrin-like domain, as well as an EGF-like domain. Through its disintegrin-like domain, this protein specifically interacts with the integrin beta chain, beta 3. It also interacts with Src family protein-tyrosine kinases in a phosphorylation-dependent manner, suggesting that this protein may function in cell-cell adhesion as well as in cellular signaling. Multiple alternatively spliced transcript variants encoding distinct isoforms have been observed.

Clinical significance

Arthritis 

ADAM15 has been associated with a number of diseases, most recently Rheumatoid Arthritis where it is required for the activation of the FAK and Src pathways to generate apoptosis resistance in response to apoptotic signalling or cell stress. ADAM15 also has an antiapoptotic effect in osteoarthritic chondrocytes.

Cancer 

The precise role of ADAM15 in cancer is still unclear but the metalloprotein has been linked to a number of different cancerous diseases such as Breast cancer where the expression of the protein is increased in carcinoma in-situ, invasive carcinoma and metastatic breast cancer tissues Additionally, the alternative splice variant forms of ADAM15 have also been correlated with different prognosis in 48 breast cancer patients based upon their expression levels.   ADAM15 has also been shown to have a role in prostate cancer again through increased expression in neoplastic and metastatic tissues compared to normal prostate tissues and also through its modulation of epithelial cell- tumour cell interactions.

Interactions 

ADAM15 has been shown to interact with:
 Grb2, 
 HCK, 
 Lck and 
 SH3GL2, and
 SNX9.

The alternatively spliced isoforms have also been shown to exhibit different preferential interactions with proteins containing SH3 domains.

References

Further reading

External links
 The MEROPS online database for peptidases and their inhibitors: M12.215
 

Proteases
Human proteins
EC 3.4.24